Handy Hardware is a hardware store distribution center serving 1,000 retailers in 9 states in the United States, from Colorado to Florida, and in Mexico and Central America as well.  It was founded in 1961 in Houston, Texas.

Handy Hardware is a member/owner of Distribution America, second largest wholesale marketing organization in the United States.

In 2016, Handy Hardware was purchased by Hardware Distribution Warehouses, Inc.

In early 2019, Handy Hardware and Hardware Distribution Warehouses, Inc. went out of business.

References

External links 
 Handy Hardware
 Handy Hardware Ireland

Economy of the Southeastern United States
Hardware stores of the United States
American companies established in 1954
Retail companies established in 1954
American companies disestablished in 2019
Retail companies disestablished in 2019
Retailers' cooperatives in the United States
Companies based in Houston
1954 establishments in Texas
2019 disestablishments in Texas